21 Junior is a Kosovan free-to-air television channel based in Pristina. It was launched in September 2009, by Company 21 and it's the first Kosovan TV channel dedicated to kids 24/7. A big part of its programming includes TV shows and movies by the European animation company Mondo TV. It also broadcasts children's music and musicals all made in Kosovo. Since 2015, the channel is also available in HD.

Programming

Original programming

Current programming

Movies broadcast

See also
 Television in Kosovo
 List of radio stations in Kosovo
 RTV21

References

External links
 Official website
 Smart World TV

Television stations in Kosovo
Radio stations in Kosovo
Television channels and stations established in 2009
Children's television networks